Machete Avenue is a Canadian indie rock duo from London, Ontario, composed of lead vocalist Chad Michael Stewart and keyboardist Scott Parker.

History
Stewart, from St. Thomas, and Parker, from London (also known as Scotty Scheid), formed Machete Avenue in 2005. They began performing in London and in the Toronto area, and later that year the pair released an EP, The First Cuts. The tracks consisted of vocals, keyboard and acoustic guitar.

Machete Avenue took part in Guelph's Wakestock festival in 2007, and won London Music Awards in 2007 and 2008.  A second album, "Machete Avenue", was released in 2008. A percussionist, Vince Jerzy, joined the group in 2008.  The band performed and recorded together until early 2009, after which Stewart continued to perform alone under the name Machete Avenue.

Discography
The First Cuts EP (Conquer the World Records 2005, Underground Operations re-issue 2006)
Machete Avenue Album. (2008)

Singles
 The Capsule
 Cut To Pieces
 Hollow

Videos
 "Cut To Pieces" from the album The First Cuts (2005)
 "Hollow" from the album Machete Avenue (2008)

See also
 List of bands from Canada

References

External links
 Machete Avenue
 Machete Avenue MySpace page

2005 establishments in Ontario
Canadian indie rock groups
Musical groups established in 2005
Musical groups from London, Ontario
Conquer the World Records artists